Pesca is a town and municipality in Colombia.

Pesca may also refer to:

 Pešca, a town in Montenegro
 La Pesca, a town in Mexico
 Mike Pesca (born 1971), American radio journalist
 Pesca (footballer) (Jorge González Moral, born 1992), Spanish footballer

See also
 Pesco (disambiguation)
 Pesche, a municipality of the Province of Isernia, Molise, Italy